Football is, along with Rugby union, one of the most popular sports in the African island nation of Madagascar. The sport is governed in the country by the Malagasy Football Federation.

International
Madagascar's national football team, nicknamed the Barea, has not had great success internationally having never qualified for a FIFA World Cup. They have performed well in some minor competitions however, advancing to the semifinals in the COSAFA Cup (contested between national teams from Southern Africa) in 2008 and winning the football portion of the Indian Ocean Games twice. Some of the country's best players have played professionally overseas, mostly in France.

Madagascar reached the quarterfinals in the 2019 Africa Cup of Nations, beating teams such as Nigeria and DR Congo . This was the first time the country has qualified for an African Cup of Nations.

Domestic
Madagascar has an unusual domestic arrangement of leagues. The THB Champions League is the country's most prestigious club honor, but clubs qualify for it annually from one of the 22 regional leagues, much like in the UEFA Champions League. The Anamalanga Regional League is the most notable of these regional leagues, which includes the capital of Antananarivo and domestic powerhouses like Ajesaia and AS Adema. The country's main cup competition is the Coupe de Madagascar, whose winners play the THB Champions League winner in the Super Coupe de Madagascar.

In 2019 the Malagsy Football Federation announced the commencement of a new professional league, the Malagasy Pro League.

League system

Malagasy football venues

References